General elections were held in Southern Rhodesia on 14 December 1962. Voters elected 65 members of the Legislative Assembly. The election was notable for bringing to power the Rhodesian Front, initially under Winston Field, which set the colony on the course for its eventual Unilateral Declaration of Independence.

Background
The election was the first held under the 1961 constitution which brought in a new electoral system. The chief issue in the elections was the future of the Federation of Rhodesia and Nyasaland, under which Southern Rhodesia formed a united country with Northern Rhodesia and Nyasaland, under the leadership of Sir Roy Welensky. The United Federal Party government of Sir Edgar Whitehead favoured continuation of the Federation in some form, together with moves towards multiracialism.

Opponents of the Federation had formed the Dominion Party but coming up to the election, the party had suffered division. The Rhodesia Reform Party had been formed by Ian Smith early in 1962 as a more moderate group. Dominion Party leader William Harper resigned in February 1962, stating that he intended this to be the catalyst towards the creation of a united opposition. By mid-March, the Dominion Party and the Rhodesia Reform Party had put together a broad plan for the new Rhodesian Front with Winston Field, from the Dominion Party, as its leader. Field had to call for unity at the first RF congress in September 1962.

Electoral system
The electorate was divided into the 'A roll' and the 'B roll'. The 'A roll' and consisted of people meeting certain income and property qualifications, which were lowered if the person had more extensive education. This in practice meant that 95.2% of those on the A roll were of European descent. The 'B roll' which consisted of those meeting a lesser income cap or a lesser property cap, both lowered for those with a longer education. 91.3% of those on the B roll were of African descent, although some Europeans only qualified for this roll. The figures were exaggerated by a largely successful campaign on behalf of black African nationalist leaders to persuade their supporters not to register to boycott the election. Most black Africans did not qualify for either roll anyway.

There were two different types of place returning members to the House of Assembly. The colony was divided into 50 constituencies each returning a single member, and in addition there were 15 districts which also returned one member each. For the constituencies, voters from the 'A roll' and the 'B roll' could both vote, with their votes of equal value. Due to the fact that the 'A roll' was substantially larger than the 'B roll', these constituencies were almost entirely elected by Rhodesians of European descent. Theoretically, if the 'B roll' votes was more than a quarter of the total, they would be reduced in value to a quarter, but in practice this never happened due to the low enrollment and low turnout.

Both rolls also voted for the district seats. However, the total votes from the 'A roll' were reduced to equal a quarter of those of the 'B roll' voters. This meant that the district seats were largely elected by Africans.

Campaign
There was a robust campaign, which all understood as leading to a watershed election. Political meetings saw a great deal of heckling. The RF was keen to reassure nervous voters that it supported some continued links with Northern Rhodesia, and campaigned for tougher enforcement of law and order and security. Both the UFP and the RF supported moves to independence but the RF was more keen, and stated that independence could be either within or without the Commonwealth.

The principal division was on race relations. The UFP leader Sir Edgar Whitehead pledged to appoint Southern Rhodesia's first African Minister should he be re-elected. The RF insisted that the UFP's moves were reckless and endangered Rhodesian society. They saw the 1961 constitution as opening the door to African dominance of Europeans "before the former has acquired adequate knowledge and experience of democratic government" and pointed to Kenya, where Europeans had been forced out of the country, as an example of what might happen. The UFP regarded the RF as reactionaries and throwbacks, and a UFP poster depicted a white man identified as an RF supporter with his head literally in the sand.

Results
A win by the UFP was generally expected. The Examiner magazine said "Let no one doubt that the U.F.P. will win hands down; the Establishment always does in Southern Rhodesia." However, much to everyone's surprise (including their own), the RF found itself with a large majority of the Constituencies and an overall majority in the House of Assembly. The UFP took 14 out of 15 of the Districts, with one (Highfield) going to Dr Ahrn Palley as an Independent candidate. The UFP thus numbered 14 Africans out of a caucus of 29, but the party soon ceased to be a force in Rhodesian politics; from 1965 then until the end of minority rule in 1979 no opposition members were elected from the primarily European constituencies, Rhodesia thus would have a dominant party system.

By constituency

District results

Byelections

Matobo
Harry Roberts died on 13 March 1963, which led to a byelection in Matobo on 23 May 1963.

Arundel
Blair Ewing resigned from Parliament on 4 August 1964 for business reasons, leading to a byelection in the Arundel constituency on 1 October 1964. Sir Roy Welensky, former Prime Minister of the Federation of Rhodesia and Nyasaland, returned to politics in an attempt to regain the seat; prompted by this, the Rhodesian Front decided that a leading party member newly appointed as Deputy Prime Minister, Clifford Dupont, should give up his seat at Charter to oppose him. Sir Roy was unsuccessful, polling only 633 votes to 1,079 for Dupont.

Avondale
The appointment of A.R.W. Stumbles as Speaker of the Southern Rhodesian Parliament on 28 July 1964 led to his resignation on 1 August 1964. A byelection in his Avondale constituency was held on the same day as that at Arundel. Jack William Pithey, for the Rhodesian Front, won with 1,042 votes to 416 for Sidney Sawyer.

Charter
Following Clifford Dupont's resignation on 15 September 1964 to contest Arundel, Roger Tancred Robert Hawkins was elected unopposed on 6 November 1964, to follow him in his previous constituency.

Matabeleland South
Julius Masola died on 8 September 1964, leading to a byelection in the district of Matabeleland South on 26 November 1964. The result was:

References
 Source Book of Parliamentary Elections and Referenda in Southern Rhodesia 1898–1962 ed. by F.M.G. Willson (Department of Government, University College of Rhodesia and Nyasaland, Salisbury 1963)
 "Rhodesia: The Road to Rebellion" by James Barber (Oxford University Press, 1967)

Elections in Southern Rhodesia
Southern Rhodesia
1962 in Southern Rhodesia
Southern Rhodesia
Southern Rhodesia